Anastasios "Tasos" Karagiozis (born 20 June 1997) is a Greek professional footballer who plays as a goalkeeper.

References

1997 births
Living people
Greek footballers
Super League Greece players
Football League (Greece) players
Levadiakos F.C. players
Volos N.F.C. players
Kozani F.C. players
Association football goalkeepers
Footballers from Katerini